Motown and Didi is a realistic fiction novel by Walter Dean Myers.  It was first published in 1984 by Viking.  It is centered on two African-American lovers living in Harlem, New York City, as they navigate ghetto life and their romantic relationship.

Main characters
Motown - One of the main character in the story. He is Didi's lover, a loner, and named after the record company,  Motown.

Didi - The other main character in the story. She dreams of moving from Harlem using her scholarship offerings and grades. Like Motown she is a loner. She takes care of her younger brother who later dies of a drug overdose.

Awards
Coretta Scott King Award

See also
Harlem
List of books set in New York City

References
http://www.plcmc.org/readers_club/reviews/tresults.asp?id=1058

External links
Goodreads
Walter Dean Myers Website

1984 American novels
African-American young adult novels
American young adult novels
Coretta Scott King Award-winning works
Harlem in fiction
Novels by Walter Dean Myers
Novels set in Manhattan